The Family Coalition Party ran a number of candidates in the 1995 provincial election, all of whom were defeated.  Information about these candidates may be found here.

Candidates

Brantford: Paul Vandervet
Paul Vandervet received 762 votes (2.27%), finishing fourth against Progressive Conservative candidate Ron Johnson.

Hamilton Centre: Tom Wigglesworth

Wigglesworth trained as a millwright, and was studying automated engineering at Mohawk College at the time of the election.  He was thirty-three years old (Hamilton Spectator, 27 May 1995).  He argued that the province should make abortion more difficult to access, and called for the elimination of the Ontario Human Rights Commission (Hamilton Spectator, 19 May 1995).  He received 376 votes (1.73%), finishing fourth against New Democratic Party incumbent David Christopherson.

Shortly after the election, he wrote against the concept of "sexual orientation" and claimed that homosexuals were undermining the fabric of society (Spectator, 28 July 1995).  He campaigned for a seat on Hamilton's separate school board in 2003, and was defeated in Ward 8.

St. Catharines: Jon Siemens

No information.  Siemens received 245 votes (0.83%), finishing fourth against Liberal incumbent Jim Bradley.

St. Catharines—Brock: Bert Pynenburg

Pynenburg works for Business Network International in Niagara-on-the-Lake.  He is a Catholic, and a member of the Diocese of St. Catharines Holy Name Society.

He first campaigned for the Legislative Assembly of Ontario in the 1990 provincial election, and received 1,331 votes (4.46%) to finish fifth in St. Catharines against Liberal incumbent Jim Bradley.  His vote total fell to 598 in the 1995 election, and he finished fourth against Tom Froese of the Progressive Conservative Party.

Windsor—Walkerville: Donna Halliday

Halliday was 32 years old at the time of the election.  She had four children, and described herself as a full-time mother.  Previously, she was a supply teacher in Windsor's separate school board.  Halliday claimed that her main purpose in campaigning was to support tax benefits for parents sending their children to independent schools.  She also favoured government subsidies for stay-at-home parents raising children, and endorsed "workfare" for those receiving mother's allowance (Windsor Star, 3 June 1995).

Halliday received 957 votes (3.84%), finishing fourth against Liberal candidate Dwight Duncan.

References

1995